Call the Midwife is a BBC period drama series about a group of nurse midwives working in the East End of London in the late 1950s and 1960s. The principal cast of the show has included Jessica Raine, Miranda Hart, Helen George, Bryony Hannah, Laura Main, Jenny Agutter, Pam Ferris, Judy Parfitt, Cliff Parisi, Stephen McGann, Ben Caplan, Daniel Laurie, Emerald Fennell, Victoria Yeates, Jack Ashton, Linda Bassett, Charlotte Ritchie, Kate Lamb, Jennifer Kirby, Annabelle Apsion and Leonie Elliott. 

The series is produced by Neal Street Productions, a production company founded and owned by the film director and producer Sam Mendes, Call the Midwife executive producer Pippa Harris, and Caro Newling. The first series, set in 1957, premiered in the United Kingdom on 15 January 2012. The series was created by Heidi Thomas, originally based on the memoirs of Jennifer Worth who worked with the Community of St. John the Divine, an Anglican religious order, at their convent in the East End in London. The order was founded as a nursing order in 1849. The show's storylines have extended beyond the memoirs to include new, historically sourced material. For the most part it depicts the day-to-day lives of the midwives and those in their local neighbourhood of Poplar, with certain historical events of the era having a direct or indirect effect on the characters and storylines.

Call the Midwife achieved high ratings in its first series, making it the most successful new drama series on BBC One since 2001. Ten more series of eight episodes each have aired subsequently year-on-year, along with an annual Christmas special broadcast every Christmas Day since 2012. It is also broadcast in the United States on the PBS network, with the first series starting on 30 September 2012.

Critical reception has been mostly positive, and the series has won numerous awards and nominations. It has been praised for tackling topical subjects and contemporary social, cultural and economic issues, including nationalised healthcare, infertility, teen pregnancy, adoption, the importance of local community, miscarriage and stillbirths, abortion and unwanted pregnancies, birth defects, poverty, common illnesses, epidemic disease, prostitution, incest, religion and faith, racism and prejudice, same-sex attraction and female genital mutilation. Some aspects of love—maternal, paternal, filial, fraternal, sisterly, romantic, or the love of friends—are explored in every episode.

Plot

The plot follows newly qualified midwife Jenny Lee, as well as the work of midwives and the nuns of Nonnatus House, a nursing convent and part of an Anglican religious order, coping with the medical problems in the deprived Poplar district of London's desperately poor East End in the 1950s. The Sisters and midwives carry out many nursing duties across the community. However, with between 80 and 100 babies being born each month in Poplar alone, the primary work is to help bring safe childbirth to women in the area and to look after their countless newborns.

The first series, set in early 1957, tackles the "Baby Boom", issues of poverty in the East End and post-war immigration. The second series set in 1958 depicts the introduction of gas and air as a form of pain relief, unexploded ordnance, an outbreak of tuberculosis, a baby born with spina bifida, and ends with the condemning of the Nonnatus House building. The third series, set in 1959, depicts cystic fibrosis, polio, caring for the terminally ill, and midwifery in a prison context. The Child Migrants Programme, the threat of nuclear warfare (including emergency response guidelines issued by local Civil Defence Corps), LGBT rights, and syphilis among sex workers are addressed in 1960-set fourth series, with a patient with typhoid, the effects of thalidomide, the introduction of the contraceptive pill and impact of stroke in the fifth set in 1961. The sixth series, set in 1962, touches on domestic violence, an explosion at the local docks, interracial marriage, female genital mutilation, mental health, and introduces Reggie, a recurring character who has Down syndrome. The seventh series, set in 1963, introduces the first major character of colour, Nurse Lucille Anderson, as well as dementia, racial abuse, leprosy, and meningitis featuring in storylines. The eighth series, set in 1964, covers the topic of abortion (which was not legalised until 1967), sickle cell disease, babies born with cleft lip and cleft palate, and intersex people. Set in 1965, the ninth series addresses diphtheria, a blind expectant mother, and the continued role and relevance of Nonnatus House in the community. The tenth series, set in 1966, compares the practice at Nonnatus House with the private Lady Emily Clinic in Mayfair, PKU, diabetes, and the controversy of abortion on the eve of legalisation. Christmas special episodes also explore the conditions in a mission in South Africa, the Outer Hebrides, and the order orphanage.

Cast and characters

Call the Midwife is based on the memoirs of Jennifer Worth, featuring narration – and an on-screen appearance in the 2014 Christmas Special – by Vanessa Redgrave as an older Jenny.

The current cast consists of Jenny Agutter as Sister Julienne, Sister-in-charge at Nonnatus House, Linda Bassett as Nurse Phyllis Crane, Nursing deputy sister-in-charge and  Laura Main as Sister Bernadette (later sister Shelagh Turner, sister-in-charge at the surgery. Senior Nurse Beatrix "Trixie" Franklin, Nurse Anne Nancy Corrigan (Helen George, Megan Cusack), health visitor  Sister Veronica (Rebecca Gethings). Medical orderly and retired nurse & midwife  Sister Monica Joan (Judy Parfitt). General practitioner and clinical lead Dr Patrick Turner,  Pre-registration house officer Timothy "Tim" Turner (Max Macmillan). Surgery secretary Miss Millicent Higgins (Georgie Glen). Caretaker and shopkeeper Frederick "Fred" Buckle and councillor and shop owner Violet Buckle, (Cliff Parisi and Annabelle Apsion), shop assistant  Reggie Jackson (Daniel Laurie). Minister Cyril Robinson (Zephryn Taitte), Businessman and sponsor Matthew Aylward (Olly Rix). 

 Jessica Raine as Nursing Sister Jennifer "Jenny" Lee (series 1–3)
 Jenny Agutter as Sister Julienne
 Pam Ferris as Sister Evangelina (series 1–5)
 Judy Parfitt as Sister Monica Joan
 Helen George as Nurse Beatrix "Trixie" Franklin (later Aylward)
 Bryony Hannah as Nurse Cynthia Miller (later Sister Mary Cynthia) (series 1–6)
 Miranda Hart as Matron Camilla "Chummy" Fortescue-Cholmondeley-Browne (later Noakes) (series 1–4)
 Laura Main as Sister Bernadette (later Nurse Shelagh Turner)
 Stephen McGann as Dr Patrick Turner
 Cliff Parisi as Frederick "Fred" Buckle
 Ben Caplan as Police Constable (later Sergeant) Peter Noakes (series 1–6)
 Max Macmillan as Timothy "Tim" Turner (series 3–; recurring series 2)
 Dorothy Atkinson as Auxiliary Nurse Jane Sutton (series 2)
 Emerald Fennell as Nurse Patience "Patsy" Mount (series 3–6; guest series 2)
 Victoria Yeates as Sister Winifred (series 3–8)
 Jack Ashton as the Rev Tom Hereward (series 4–7; recurring series 3)
 Charlotte Ritchie as Nurse Barbara Gilbert (later Hereward) (series 4–7)
 Linda Bassett as Nurse Phyllis Crane (series 4–present)
 Kate Lamb as Nurse Delia Busby (series 5–6; recurring series 4)
 Jennifer Kirby as Nurse Valerie Dyer (series 6–9)
 Annabelle Apsion as Violet Gee (later Buckle) (series 7-; recurring series 4–6)
 Jack Hawkins as Christopher Dockerill (series 6–7)
 Leonie Elliott as Nurse Lucille Anderson (later Robinson) (series 7–12)
 Fenella Woolgar as Sister Hilda (series 8-11)
 Ella Bruccoleri as Sister Frances (series 8–12)
 Daniel Laurie as Reggie Jackson (series 10–; recurring series 6–9)
 Georgie Glen as Miss Millicent Higgins (series 10–; recurring series 8–9)
 Zephryn Taitte as Cyril Robinson (series 10–; recurring series 8–9)
 Olly Rix as Matthew Aylward (series 10-present)
 Megan Cusack as Nurse Nancy Corrigan (series 11–; recurring series 10)
 Rebecca Gethings as Sister Veronica (series 12-present)

Episodes

Production

Locations
A number of historic sites in the south of England have been used as filming locations for scenes in Call the Midwife. The ship in the opening titles is the Shaw, Savill & Albion Line liner  in dry dock at the King George V Dock and the road is Saville Road, Silvertown, east London.

Many of the exterior scenes are shot at The Historic Dockyard Chatham standing in for East London streets and buildings. In the first two series, Nonnatus House was filmed at St. Joseph's Missionary College in Mill Hill, North London until the building was converted to luxury flats at which point a new Nonnatus House set was created at Longcross Studios in Surrey where sets were built for the new Nonnatus and interior sets.  is used for scenes on ships during the series and the order's mother house is filmed in West Wittering. A reconstructed prefab house at the Chiltern Open Air Museum in Buckinghamshire has also been used as a filming location.

Commissioning
On 11 February 2013, Ben Stephenson, BBC Controller for Drama, announced that he had commissioned a 2013 Christmas special, and a third series of eight episodes to be broadcast in 2014. The fourth series aired in the US in 2015, finishing its eight-episode run on 17 May. A Christmas special also aired in 2015.

A fifth series was commissioned for 2016, shortly after series four filming was completed. A sixth series was commissioned, which included a 2016 Christmas episode set in South Africa. On 23 November 2016, the BBC announced a three-year deal with Neal Street Productions, commissioning a seventh, eighth, and ninth series, each with a Christmas special. On 4 March 2019, the BBC announced it had commissioned two further series and Christmas specials, through to an eleventh series in 2022, moving the plot into the late-sixties.

On 13 April 2021 – five days before series 10 was due to start broadcasting on BBC One and with the 11th series about to begin filming – the BBC announced that two more series had been commissioned, keeping the show on air until 2024. Series 12 and 13 will each comprise eight one-hour episodes as well as a Christmas special.In February 2023, the BBC announced it commissioned two more series of nine episodes (including Christmas Specials) moving the story into 1971, keeping the show on air until 2026.

Soundtrack
For the first three series of the programme the score and the title theme used was composed by Peter Salem and since series four the music has been composed by Maurizio Malagnini. The orchestral score, mainly comprising strings and piano accompanies the emotional moments of the series, with Malagnini calling it a diary of the emotions of the series, while more upbeat moments are often accompanied by music appropriate to the setting year. The score was performed by the London Chamber Orchestra.

There have been two albums released with music from the series: a 2012 released Call the Midwife: The Album consisting of period appropriate songs and score tracks from the first series by Salem and a second Call the Midwife: Original Soundtrack Album released in 2018 featuring highlights from Malagnini's score from series 4-7.

Release

Broadcast
In May 2012, BBC Worldwide and the American Public Broadcasting Service (PBS) announced that the first series of Call the Midwife would premiere in the United States on 30 September 2012. BBC Worldwide also sold the programme to SVT (Sweden); NRK (Norway); RÚV (Iceland); Yle (Finland); AXN White (Spain; Portugal); ERT (Greece); ABC in Australia and TVNZ 1 in New Zealand, where its debut recorded a 35% share of the audience – 20% above average. In July 2012 BBC Worldwide announced it sold the global Video on Demand rights of the programme to Netflix, while all episodes are also on BBC iPlayer in the UK.

The second series of Call the Midwife was sold to PBS for transmission from 31 March 2013 and to SVT (Sweden) for transmission from 19 May 2013. In February 2013, BBC Worldwide reported that Call the Midwife had been sold in over one hundred global territories, with global sales contributing to the UK's position as the second largest TV exporter behind the United States. In February 2017, it was reported that the BBC had exported Call the Midwife to 237 global territories.

A second series of eight episodes aired in the UK in early 2013. The series achieved a consolidated series average of 10.47 million viewers. A third eight-part series aired in the UK from January 2014, with a consolidated average of 10.53 million.

On 28 February 2014, BBC confirmed that Call the Midwife had been commissioned for a 2014 Christmas special and fourth series, to air in 2015. On 3 November 2014, BBC announced that an eight-episode fifth series had been commissioned; it began airing on 17 January 2016; the fifth series takes the story into 1961. The sixth series began airing in the UK on 22 January 2017, taking the drama into 1962. Series seven, again consisting of eight episodes, began airing on Sunday, 21 January 2018, with episode one viewed by 9.87 million viewers. It was the No.1 rated programme on UK TV for all weeks of its transmission, ending 11 March 2018. The eighth series premiered on 13 January 2019.

Home media 

The first series was released in a Region 2, two-disc set on 12 March 2012. Series two was released on 1 April 2013 in the UK (region 2) with a collector's edition, Call the Midwife Collection, containing series one, two, and the 2012 Christmas Special, released on the same date.

In the United States, the first series was released on DVD and Blu-ray on 6 November 2012. Series two was released on DVD and Blu-ray on 18 June 2013. Series three was released on Blu-ray on 20 May 2014. Series four was released on Blu-ray on 19 May 2015.

Reception

Critical response
A second series was immediately commissioned after the opening episode attracted an audience of nearly 10 million viewers. The second episode increased its audience to 10.47 million, while the third continued the climb to 10.66. Episode four's rating reached 10.89 million.

In the United States, the series one transmission on PBS drew an average household audience rating of 2.1, translating into three million viewers – 50 percent above PBS's primetime average for the 2011–12 series. The autumn 2012 PBS broadcast of the first series received widespread critical acclaim, earning a Metacritic score of 8.0. The Wall Street Journal declared that "this immensely absorbing drama is worth any trouble it takes to catch up with its singular pleasures", while The Washington Post stated that "the cast is marvelous, the gritty, post-war set pieces are meticulously recreated". TV Guide called the series "a delight to watch", while the San Francisco Chronicle described it as "sentimental, poignant and often heartbreaking". Maane Khatchatourian of Entertainment Weekly wrote, "Just what the doctor ordered."

The second series opened with a record overnight audience of 9.3 million UK viewers, going on to achieve a consolidated series average of 10.47 million viewers. This was almost 2 million above the slot average, and by some distance the most popular UK drama in every week of transmission. When viewing figures from BBC's iPlayer video streaming service and a narrative repeat were included as part of the BBC Live Plus 7 metric, the total number of viewers per week was found to be almost 12 million.

Caitlin Moran in The Times called this "an iron hand in a velvet glove", while Allison Pearson in The Daily Telegraph lauded its ability to "tickle the middle of the brow while touching the most anguished parts of the human condition". In particular, commentators have noted the attention given to female social issues in the drama's post-war, pre-pill setting. Alison Graham in the Radio Times dubbed Call the Midwife "a magnificently subversive drama" and "the torchbearer of feminism on television," while Caitlin Moran claimed the series encapsulated "how unbelievably terrifying, dreary and vile it was to be a working-class woman 60 years ago."

After the departure of Jessica Raine as Jenny Lee at the end of the third series, Jennifer Worth's family stated that Call The Midwife no longer resembled Worth's stories.

Accolades

References

External links 

 
 
 
 PBS: Call the Midwife
 Broadcast: Midwife delivered across Europe 
 Digital Spy: 'Call the Midwife' to deliver Christmas special, BBC confirms
 BBC Worldwide sells Call the Midwife Video on Demand rights to Netflix
 TV Choice Magazine: Interview with Pam Ferris and Jessica Raine 
 The Guardian: Interview with Miranda Hart
 Huffington Post: Interview with Jenny Agutter
 Call the Midwife Tour
 Call the Midwife, Season 11

2012 British television series debuts
2010s British drama television series
2020s British drama television series
2010s British medical television series
2020s British medical television series
BBC high definition shows
BBC television dramas
Christianity in popular culture
English-language television shows
Lesbian-related television shows
Television series about nuns
Television series by All3Media
Television series set in the 1950s
Television series set in the 1960s
Television shows based on non-fiction books
Television shows set in London
Television shows shot in Kent
Works about midwifery
Call the Midwife (franchise)